Sætre is a Norwegian biscuit company.

It was established in 1883 by Hans Otto Røhr at Sætre farm in Heggedal. The production moved to Kristiania in 1907 and Kolbotn in 1967. In 2000 the production at Kolbotn was discontinued, moving to Kungälv. The company was owned by Borregaard from 1984 to 1986 and the Orkla Group since 1986. Sætre produces the majority of cookies sold in Norway.

List of brands 
Gjende is a cookie by Sætre, launched in 1954. The cookie exists in several variants, including Gjende Sjokolade (Chocolate), Gjende Vanilje (Vanilla), and Gjende Karamell (Caramel).

Ballerina is a cookie by Sætre, launched in 1993. The cookie exists in several variants, including Ballerina Original, Ballerina Nougat, Ballerina Melkesjoko (Milk Chocolate) and Ballerina Blåbærlykke (Blueberry).

Bixit is a series of cookies by Sætre, launched in 1991. The cookie mainly consists of oats, but exists in several variants, including Bixit Original, Bixit Sjokolade (Chocolate), Bixit Havrebar Quinoa & Bringebær (Quinoa & Raspberry) and Bixit Havrebar Mandel & Sjokolade (Almond & Chocolate).

Other Sætre brands include:

 Marie
 Per
 Ballerina
 Bokstavkjeks
 Kornmo
 Digestive
 Café Bakeriet

Many of the above brands have received praise from newspaper for being healthier than other well known Norwegian brands.

References

Food and drink companies of Norway
Food and drink companies established in 1883
Companies based in Akershus